Heinz-Ludwig Schmidt (2 March 1920 – 15 August 2008) was a German football manager.

Schmidt coached SC Tasmania 1900 Berlin during the 1965–66 Bundesliga season.

References

External links 
 

1920 births
2008 deaths
German football managers
Bundesliga managers
Tennis Borussia Berlin managers